Marcelo Arévalo and Miguel Ángel Reyes-Varela were the defending champions and successfully defended their title, defeating Ariel Behar and Roberto Quiroz 1–6, 6–4, [12–10] in the final.

Seeds

Draw

References

External links
 Main draw

San Luis Open Challenger Tour - Doubles
2019 Doubles